Krasnogorsky District (Krasnogórskiy raion) is the name of several administrative and municipal districts in Russia. The name is generally derived from or related to the collocation "krasnaya gora", meaning roughly "(a) red/beautiful mountain(s)/hill(s)".

Districts of the federal subjects

Krasnogorsky District, Altai Krai, an administrative and municipal district of Altai Krai
Krasnogorsky District, Bryansk Oblast, an administrative and municipal district of Bryansk Oblast
Krasnogorsky District, Moscow Oblast, an administrative and municipal district of Moscow Oblast
Krasnogorsky District, Udmurt Republic, an administrative and municipal district of the Udmurt Republic

City divisions

Krasnogorsky City District, a city district of Kamensk-Uralsky, a city in Sverdlovsk Oblast

See also
Krasnogorsk (disambiguation)

References